James Monroe Thompson House, also known as Shady Rest, is a historic home located near Saxapahaw, Alamance County, North Carolina. The original one-story, single-pen, log house was built about 1850.  In 1872, a two-story log addition was built, and the original building used as a kitchen. The log house is sheathed in weatherboard and sits on a stone foundation.

It was added to the National Register of Historic Places in 1993.

References

Log houses in the United States
Houses on the National Register of Historic Places in North Carolina
Houses completed in 1872
Houses in Alamance County, North Carolina
National Register of Historic Places in Alamance County, North Carolina
Log buildings and structures on the National Register of Historic Places in North Carolina